Bathygobius burtoni is a species of goby native to the Atlantic shores of western Africa where it is a denizen of tide pools. The specific name honours Captain Sir Richard Francis Burton (1821-1890), the English explorer, geographer, translator, writer, soldier, orientalist, cartographer, ethnologist, spy, linguist, poet, fencer, and diplomat, who collected the type specimen. This species has a very limited distribution and is known from only five locations in an area in which there has been a huge increase in the human population and the IUCN has assessed this species an Endangered.

References

burtoni
Fish of Africa
Fish described in 1875
Taxonomy articles created by Polbot